Keumjeong High School (Hanja: 金井高等學校), located in Busan, is a high school in South Korea. It was founded in 1986 and chosen as Autonomic Public School. It has a Taegwondo class and its Taegwondo team has won many prizes. This school is supported by the country because it is an Autonomic Public School which is allowed to arrange curricula to increase students' achievements. It was also chosen as a School of Promoting Education.

It is related to Geumjeongsan, but it is not in Geumjeong-gu. At its foundation, it was located in Geumjeong-gu, but its location is not Geumjeong-gu but Dongnae-gu now. Keumjeong High School's symbolic flower is the Japanese apricot flower, its symbolic tree is juniper, its symbolic location is Geum-saem(금샘) which is in Geumjeongsan – this is why it is related to Geumjeongsan. Its symbolic character is Geum-ho(금호).

External links
 Official Website 
 Graduates' Association Website 

Buildings and structures in Busan
Educational institutions established in 1986
High schools in South Korea
1986 establishments in South Korea
Boys' schools in South Korea